Dodman Island is an island  long, lying  south-east of Rabot Island and  west of Ferin Head, off the west coast of Graham Land, Antarctica. The island was charted and named by the British Graham Land Expedition, 1934–37, under John Rymill.

Important Bird Area
A small (12 ha) island lying about 2.5 km to the north of Dodman has been identified as an Important Bird Area (IBA) by BirdLife International because it supports a breeding colony of Antarctic shags, with 163 pairs recorded there in 1984.

See also 
 List of Antarctic and subantarctic islands

References 

Important Bird Areas of Antarctica
Seabird colonies
Islands of Graham Land
Graham Coast